Pannaippulam Grama Niladhari Division is a Grama Niladhari Division of the Valikamam West (Chankanai) Divisional Secretariat of Jaffna District of Northern Province, Sri Lanka. It has Grama Niladhari Division Code J/176.

Pannaippulam is a surrounded by the Sillalai South, Pannakam, Sillalai North, Vadaliadaippu and Chulipuram East Grama Niladhari Divisions.

Demographics

Ethnicity 
The Pannaippulam Grama Niladhari Division has a Sri Lankan Tamil majority (99.6%). In comparison, the Valikamam West (Chankanai) Divisional Secretariat (which contains the Pannaippulam Grama Niladhari Division) has a Sri Lankan Tamil majority (99.4%)

Religion 
The Pannaippulam Grama Niladhari Division has a Hindu majority (92.3%). In comparison, the Valikamam West (Chankanai) Divisional Secretariat (which contains the Pannaippulam Grama Niladhari Division) has a Hindu majority (93.9%)

References 

Grama Niladhari Divisions of Valikamam West (Chankanai) Divisional Secretariat